Massagris honesta is a jumping spider species in the genus Massagris that lives in South Africa. It was first identified by Wanda Wesołowska in 1993.

References

Endemic fauna of South Africa
Spiders described in 1993
Salticidae
Spiders of South Africa
Taxa named by Wanda Wesołowska